Brian Dabul and Marcel Felder were the defending champions. Dabul didn't compete this year and Felder played with Andrés Molteni, losing in the quarterfinals.
Rogério Dutra da Silva and Júlio Silva won the title, defeating Vítor Manzini and Pedro Zerbinni 7–6(3), 6–2 in the final.

Seeds

Draw

Draw

References
 Doubles Draw

MasterCard Tennis Cup - Doubles
MasterCard Tennis Cup
Mast